The Rivière à la Chute is a tributary of the Sautauriski River, flowing in the administrative region of Capitale-Nationale, in Quebec, Canada. This watercourse crosses the unorganized territory of Lac-Jacques-Cartier in the MRC La Côte-de-Beaupré Regional County Municipality and the municipality of Stoneham-et-Tewkesbury, in the MRC of La Jacques-Cartier Regional County Municipality.

The course of the river flows entirely in the Jacques-Cartier National Park which is affiliated with the Société des établissements de plein air du Québec (Sépaq).

The valley of the falling river is mainly served on the east side by the route 175 which connects the towns of Quebec and Saguenay. Some secondary roads serve this area for forestry and recreational tourism activities.

Forestry is the main economic activity in the sector; recreational tourism, second.

The surface of the Rivière à la Chute (except the rapids) is generally frozen from the beginning of December to the end of March; safe circulation on the ice is generally done from the end of December to the beginning of March.

Geography 
The Rivière à la Chute takes its source from the lake of Quatre Jumeaux (), located in the unorganized territory of Lac-Jacques-Cartier, in the MRC of La Côte-de-Beaupré Regional County Municipality. This lake has an atypical shape, being encased between the mountains.

The course of the Fall River looks like a question mark. With the exception of the upper part, the course of the river flows more or less in parallel (east side) to the Jacques-Cartier River.

  towards the north-west in particular by crossing Lake Perche until at its mouth;
  to the east by crossing an area of marshland, then branching north especially by crossing Lake Vaucaire to its mouth;
  towards the northeast by bending to the east to go around a mountain, up to a stream (coming from the north);
  towards the south-east in a deep valley, up to the northern limit of the canton of Cauchon;
  south in the canton of Cauchon in a deep valley to the outlet (coming from the north) of lac de la Chute;
  to the south in a deep valley, up to the southern limit of the canton of Cauchon;
  towards the south in a deep valley, by collecting a brook (coming from the northwest), until its mouth.

The outlet of Rivière à la Chute is located on the northwest bank of the Sautauriski River.

Toponymy 
This toponym appears on various documents, cartographic or other, at least since 1925.

The toponym "Rivière à la Chute" was formalized on December 5, 1968 at the Place Names Bank of the Commission de toponymie du Québec.

Notes and references

See also 

 Jacques-Cartier National Park
 Lac-Jacques-Cartier, an unorganized territory
 Stoneham-et-Tewkesbury, a municipality
 La Côte-de-Beaupré Regional County Municipality
 La Jacques-Cartier Regional County Municipality
 Sautauriski River
 Jacques-Cartier River
 List of rivers of Quebec

External links 
Parc national de la Jacques-Cartier - Jacques-Cartier National Parc

Rivers of Capitale-Nationale
La Côte-de-Beaupré Regional County Municipality
La Jacques-Cartier Regional County Municipality